"Make Me Feel Good" is a song by Irish electronic collective Belters Only, which includes DJs Bissett and RobbieG, featuring vocals by Jazzy. It was released on 26 November 2021, via Polydor Records. In February 2022, the song reached number one in Ireland and the top 10 in the United Kingdom. They are the first homegrown Irish dance act to reach number-one in Ireland since Mark McCabe with "Maniac 2000" in 2000.

Charts

Year-end charts

Certifications

References

2021 songs
2021 debut singles
Irish Singles Chart number-one singles
Polydor Records singles